The 1921 Southwark South East by-election was a parliamentary by-election held on 14 December 1921 for the British House of Commons constituency of Southwark South East, in the Metropolitan Borough of Southwark in London.

The seat had become vacant on the death of the constituency's Coalition Liberal Member of Parliament (MP), James Arthur Dawes. Dawes had been MP for Southwark South East since the 1918 election, and before that Walworth since the January 1910 election.

History

Result

See also
 List of United Kingdom by-elections
 Southwark South East constituency

References
 
 

1921 elections in the United Kingdom
1921 in London
Elections in the London Borough of Southwark
By-elections to the Parliament of the United Kingdom in London constituencies